Mil-Muğan FK is an Azerbaijani football club based in Imishli, that currently plays in Azerbaijan First Division. The club was founded in 2004 by МКТ Istehsalat-Kommersiya, a cotton manufacturing company.

History 
The club was immediately admitted to the AFFA Supreme League after its formation. They finished 8th in 2004/05 and 9th in 2005/06. In 2006 the club also played in the UEFA Intertoto Cup due to the rejection of several Azerbaijan clubs in this competition. Although it was successful in winning the home game against Moldovan Tiraspol in the first stage (1:0), the club lost in Moldova (1:2) and thus, was out of the tournament.

The 2006/07 became the most successful season in club history. The team took 5th place and reached the Azerbaijan Cup final, losing 1:0 to FK Khazar Lankaran. Despite the loss, they secured a place in the 2007–08 UEFA Cup season thanks to the fact that FK Khazar Lankaran also won the championship. In the UEFA cup they lost 1:0 on aggregate to Groclin Grodzisk.

On 13 August 2007 UEFA declared the club defunct. However, after AFFA's help, they will participate in the Azerbaijan First Division 2009-10. In 2011 the club's owners announced again that club will be dissolved and they will not be participating in the Azerbaijan First Division. However, after a club meeting it was decided that club will participate in 2011–12 Azerbaijan First Division after all.

In 2012, the club's owners announced once again that the club will be dissolved and they will not be participating in the Azerbaijan First Division.

In 2013, the club was re-established and changed its name to Mil-Muğan FK.

Mil-Muğan FK was dissolved on 18 July 2015, after funding was pulled from the club.

Stadium 
Heydar Aliyev Stadium is a modern stadium in Imishli, Azerbaijan and is currently used as the club's home ground. It was opened on 23 March 2006 and named after Heydar Aliyev. The stadium holds 8,500 spectators.

European cup history 
Q = Qualifying

League and domestic cup history 
As of 03 December 2015:

Current squad 

(captain)

Managers 
 Elshad Ahmadov (2004–2005)
 Nadir Gasimov (2005)
 Ihor Nakonechnyi (2005–2007)
 Khalig Mustafayev (2009–2012)
 Matlab Mammadov (2013–2014)
 Khalig Mustafayev (2014–present)

References

External links 
Club's page at PFL website

Football clubs in Azerbaijan
Association football clubs established in 2004
2004 establishments in Azerbaijan
Defunct football clubs in Azerbaijan
Association football clubs disestablished in 2018
2018 disestablishments in Azerbaijan